Peter Burchard (March 1, 1921 – July 3, 2004) was an author, free-lance designer, and illustrator. He wrote the book One Gallant Rush (1965), about Colonel Robert Gould Shaw and the 54th Massachusetts Regiment, the first African-American unit in the Union Army. It was adapted for the 1989 film Glory, which won numerous awards.

World War II

Burchard served on convoys in the North Atlantic during World War II. During this time, his drawings were published by Yank magazine.

Books

Burchard primarily wrote children's books about slavery, abolitionism, and the American Civil War. He wrote 26 books and illustrated over 100.

His book One Gallant Rush: Robert Gould Shaw and His Brave Black Regiment, was the basis for the Oscar-winning 1989 film Glory.

His works include:

Adult
One Gallant Rush: Robert Gould Shaw and His Brave Black Regiment (1965/reprint 1990)

Juvenile
Balloons: From Paper Bags to Skyhooks
Jed
North by Night
Stranded
Bimby
Chito
Pioneers of Flight
Rat Hell
Frederick Douglass
Lincoln and Slavery
Digger

Honors
Burchard became a Guggenheim Fellow in 1966.

References

External links

 

1921 births
2004 deaths
Historians of the American Civil War
American children's writers
American military personnel of World War II